Shang Shu, ancestral name Ji (姬), given name unknown, was the tenth ruler of the state of Jin during the Western Zhou Dynasty. After his elder brother, Marquis Mu of Jin died in 785 BC, he gained the throne of Jin which traditionally should be passed to the eldest son, namely Chou (仇). After Shang Shu ascended the throne, Chou was forced to leave Jin in fear of his uncle.

In 781 BC, Chou brought troops to Jin to overthrow Shang Shu, and he ascended as the next ruler of Jin, Marquis Wen of Jin.

Monarchs of Jin (Chinese state)
8th-century BC Chinese monarchs
781 BC deaths
8th-century BC murdered monarchs
Assassinated Chinese politicians